Enid Kent (born January 14, 1945) is an American actress.

She was born to William Kent, a German-Jewish immigrant, insurance broker and refugee from Hitler's Nazi regime in the late 1930s, and Irene Tedrow, a veteran American actress of radio, stage, film and television, originally from Denver, Colorado.

A Hollywood High School graduate, Kent explored the world of theater from an early age, becoming a participant in the Oregon Shakespeare Festival among other endeavors. Her college years found her attending classes at San Francisco State University, eventually moving to New York to pursue acting professionally.
 
After this move, her career blossomed, and she became a television actress. She played Nurse Bigelow, a recurring character on M*A*S*H, from 1976 to 1983. She also appeared in such television series as Family Ties, Head of the Class, CHiPs, Diff'rent Strokes, Eight Is Enough, Small Wonder, and L.A. Law.

References

External links

1945 births
20th-century American actresses
American television actresses
American librarians
American women librarians
Actresses from California
Living people
People from Greater Los Angeles
Place of birth missing (living people)
21st-century American women